Elvie Shane (born May 22, 1988) is an American country music singer. He is signed to BBR Music Group and in 2020 he released his debut single "My Boy", which has charted on Country Airplay.

Shane was born in Caneyville, Kentucky, where he grew up singing in his church and listening to country music that his father played. After attending Western Kentucky University, he dropped out of college to focus on music. He began performing publicly in 2012, which led to him competing on American Idol in 2016. Although he was eliminated in the first round, he released multiple songs online including "County Roads" and "My Boy". In 2020, he was signed to BBR Music Group, which released "My Boy" to country radio.

Shane wrote the song with Russell Sutton, Lee Starr, and Nick Columbia. In December 2020, he released a music video which was directed by Peter Zavadil. "My Boy" also made the Country Airplay charts, reaching the top 10 of the chart in September 2021.

Discography

Albums

Extended plays

Singles

Notes

References

American country singer-songwriters
BBR Music Group artists
Country musicians from Kentucky
Living people
People from Grayson County, Kentucky
American male singer-songwriters
1988 births